The following is a list of works by American actress, author, and comedian Jane Lynch.

Filmography

Film

Television

Video games

Theatre

Discography

Soundtracks
 2003: A Mighty Wind
 2008: Another Cinderella Story
 2010: Glee: The Music, The Power of Madonna
 2010: Glee: The Music, Volume 3 Showstoppers
 2010: "Ohio [Glee Cast Version]" (Featuring Carol Burnett) – Single
 2013: "I Still Believe / Super Bass [Glee Cast Version]" with Darren Criss – Single
 2013: "Little Girls", "Easy Street" Bonus Track on Annie Broadway Revival Cast Recording

Albums
 2016: A Swingin' Little Christmas

References

American filmographies
Actress filmographies
Discographies of American artists
Glee discographies